South Gyeongsang Province (Gyeongsangnam-do) is divided into 8 cities (si) and 10 counties (gun). Listed below is each entity's name in English, hangul and hanja.

Cities

Counties

List by Population and Area 

Cities in South Gyeongsang Province
South Gyeongsang
Counties of South Gyeongsang Province
Lists of subdivisions of South Korea